Polyscias mauritiana is a species of plant in the family Araliaceae. It is endemic to Mauritius.

References

Endemic flora of Mauritius
mauritiana
Endangered plants
Taxonomy articles created by Polbot